The 2015 Ulster Senior Football Championship is the 127th instalment of the annual Ulster Senior Football Championship held under the auspices of Ulster GAA. It was one of the four provincial competitions of the 2015 All-Ireland Senior Football Championship. Donegal were the reigning champions following the 2014 Championship but lost to Monaghan in the final on 19 July by a point.

Teams
The Ulster championship is contested by the nine county teams in the province of Ulster.

2015 Ulster Senior Football Championship

Fixtures

Preliminary round

Quarter-finals

Semi-finals

Final

See also
 Fixtures and results
 2015 All-Ireland Senior Football Championship
 2015 Connacht Senior Football Championship
 2015 Leinster Senior Football Championship
 2015 Munster Senior Football Championship

References

2U
2015 in Northern Ireland sport
Ulster Senior Football Championship
Ulster Senior Football Championship
Ulster Senior Football Championship
Ulster Senior Football Championship